Viktorija Golubic and Magda Linette were the defending champions, having won this tournament on the ITF Women's Circuit in 2013, however, neither player chose to participate.

Kateřina Siniaková and Renata Voráčová won the title, defeating Tímea Babos and Kristina Mladenovic in the final, 2–6, 6–2, [10–5].

Seeds

Draw

External Links
 Draw

Open GDF Suez de Limoges - Doubles
Open de Limoges